17 Leporis is a binary star system in the southern constellation of Lepus. It has an overall apparent visual magnitude which varies between 4.82 and 5.06, making it luminous enough to be visible to the naked eye as a faint star. The variable star designation for this system is SS Leporis, while 17 Leporis is the Flamsteed designation. Parallax measurements yield a distance estimate of around 910 light years from the Sun. The system is moving further away from the Earth with a heliocentric radial velocity of +18.7 km/s.

This is a double-lined spectroscopic binary system with an orbital period of 260 days and an eccentricity of 0.005. The spectrum reveals the pair to consist of an A-type main-sequence star with a stellar classification of A1 V, and a red giant with a class of M6III. The close pair form a symbiotic binary with ongoing mass transfer from the giant to the hotter component. The giant does not appear to be filling its Roche lobe, so the mass transfer is coming from stellar wind off the giant. The pair are surrounded by a shell and a dusty circumbinary disk, with the former obliterating the lines from the A-type star.

Gallery

References

A-type main-sequence stars
M-type giants
Emission-line stars
Circumstellar disks
Lepus (constellation)
BD-16 1349
Leporis, 17
041511
028816
2148
Leporis, SS
Articles containing video clips
Spectroscopic binaries